Daviesia cunderdin, commonly known as Cunderdin daviesia, is a species of flowering plant in the family Fabaceae and is endemic to a restricted area in the south-west of Western Australia. It is a compact, densely-branched shrub with scattered, elliptic to egg-shaped phyllodes, and uniformly red flowers.

Description

Taxonomy and naming
Daviesia cunderdin was first formally described in 1997 by Michael Crisp and Gregory T. Chandler in Australian Systematic Botany from specimens collected near Cunderdin in 1996. The specific epithet (cunderdin) refers to the type location.

Distribution and habitat
Cunderdin daviesia grows in disturbed sites with kwongan vegetation and is only known from the type location in the Avon Wheatbelt biogeographic region of south-western Western Australia.

Conservation status
This daviesia has been classified as "Threatened Flora (Declared Rare Flora — Extant)" by the Department of Biodiversity, Conservation and Attractions and an Interim Recovery Plan has been prepared.

References

cunderdin
Eudicots of Western Australia
Plants described in 1997
Taxa named by Michael Crisp